In German railway engineering, norms (Normalien) are standards for the design and production of railway vehicles. In the 1880s and 1890s, Prussian norms were developed for the locomotives, tenders and wagons of the Prussian state railways under the direction of the railway director responsible for railway engineering, Moritz Stambke. Later, these were largely adopted by the other state railways (Länderbahnen) in Germany.

Engineering drawings
These norms are defined by engineering drawings to 1:40 scale on individual sheets and show the locomotives and wagons as full design drawings, referred to by their sheet (Musterblatt) numbers. The first drawings date from 1878. In 1885 the Minister for Public Works tasked the Hütte Academic Institute with the publication of the norms. The drawings were regularly updated as technical developments occurred. The last Prussian  drawings were issued in 1923.

Goods wagons
The design drawings for goods wagons were of special importance. The wagons built to these specifications appeared in large numbers and formed the bulk of the German wagon fleet until well after the Second World War. The 1973 DR Goods Wagon Handbook still contained most of the DSV wagon classes as well as the former Prussian Class IId wagons. The most important types are listed in the following table. Note that group IIb are goods wagons based on old designs, IIc goods wagons under 15 ton maximum load and IId goods wagons with at least 15 tons maximum load. A-group wagons are those built to the standard drawings of the DSV. Wagons according to sheets with other nos. are special designs, of which some were also built in large numbers.

Other examples
Other examples of Prussian norms are:

See also
 History of rail transport in Germany

Literature and sources 

Multiple authors (1974). Güterwagen Handbuch, Transpress VEB Verlag für Verkehrswesen, Berlin 
Behrends, H.; Hensel, W.; Wiedau, G. (1989). Güterwagen-Archiv (Band 1), Transpress VEB Verlag für Verkehrswesen, Berlin
Carstens, S.; Ossig, R. (1989). Güterwagen. Band 1. Gedeckte Wagen, W. Tümmels, Nuremberg 
Carstens, S.; Diener H. U. (1989). Güterwagen. Band 2. Gedeckte Wagen – Sonderbauarten, W. Tümmels, Nuremberg 
Carstens, S.; Diener H. U. (1996). Güterwagen. Band 3. Offene Wagen, Eigenverlag, Hasloh 
Carstens, S. (2003). Güterwagen. Band 4. Offene Wagen in Sonderbauart, MIBA-Verlag, Nuremberg 
Carstens, S. (2008). Güterwagen. Band 5. Rungen-, Schienen- und Flachwagen, MIBA-Verlag, Nuremberg 
Deutsche Bundesbahn, EZA Minden (1951). Handbuch für Umzeichnung der Güterwagen, Minden 
Deutsche Reichsbahn-Gesellschaft, Reichsbahn-Zentralamt (1928) Merkbuch für die Fahrzeuge der Reichsbahn. IV. Wagen (Regelspur). 1928 edition, Berlin 
Königl. Eisenbahn Zentralamt (1915). Merkbuch für die Fahrzeuge der Preußisch-Hessischen Staatseisenbahnverwaltung. 1915 edition, Berlin 
Troche, H. (1992) Die preußischen Normal-Güterzuglokomotiven der Gattungen G 3 und G 4. Kap. 17. Die Normalien-Güterwagen, EK-Verlag, Freiburg

Standards of Germany
Rail technologies
Rolling stock of Germany
Rail transport in Germany
Rail freight transport in Germany